Kapıkaya is a village in the District of Karaisalı, Adana Province, Turkey. Kapıkaya Canyon is to the north of the village.

References

Villages in Karaisalı District